Timothy Cheek is a Canadian historian specializing in the study of intellectuals, the history of the Chinese Communist Party, and the political system in modern China. He is Professor, Louis Cha Chair in Chinese Research and Director, Centre for Chinese Research, Institute of Asian Research, at the School of Public Policy and Global Affairs at the University of British Columbia. From 2002 to 2009 he was editor of the journal Pacific Affairs. Before going to the University of British Columbia in 2002, he taught at The Colorado College.

Education and scholarly career
After taking a B.A. in Asian Studies, with Honours, at Australian National University, in 1978, Cheek earned a Master's Degree in History, University of Virginia in 1980.  In 1986 he earned a Ph.D., History and East Asian Languages, at Harvard University, under the supervision of Philip A. Kuhn. He told an interviewer in 2020 that "All along I was trained to read lots of Chinese texts, think about them first and foremost in Chinese context, and then tell readers of English what I had found."

Cheek has served on the Board of University of British Columbia Press (since 2010), Editorial Board, Journal of the Canadian Historical Association (Ottawa), since 2007) Editorial Board, The China Journal (Canberra), since 2007), Editorial Board, Issues and Studies (Taipei) (since 2004), Editorial Board, Historiography East and West  (Leiden/Vienna) (since 2003). Editorial Board, China Information (Leiden) (1998 – ), as well as other executive or advisory positions.

Contributions and interpretations
Scholars such as Merle Goldman, with whom Cheek has collaborated, have tended to see Chinese intellectuals as dissidents or critics of the regime, while Cheek has tended to assume that the intellectuals he studies see themselves as working within the regime, broadly conceived, that is, as  "establishment intellectuals." The introduction to a group of essays he edited with Carol Lee Hamrin comments that "anti-establishment intellectuals in China have less to gain and more to lose than their American counterparts", and that since all Chinese intellectuals are state employees, "by playing assigned roles as supporters of the establishment and servants of the state, they gain patriotic self-esteem, outlets for their publications, power over their peers, and opportunities for scarce commodities such as housing and travel abroad".

A review of his edited volume, Cambridge Companion to Mao, wrote that the essays in it "contribute to an understanding of Mao Zedong that is as messy and complex as it is compelling. The text, moreover, encourages readers to engage the problem of knowing the historical Mao, while reminding the reader of the equal importance of Mao’s ahistorical legacy. Sadly, this text will most likely never be sold in airport bookstores alongside popular biographies of Mao, but Cheek’s collection will hopefully spark lively discussion in seminar classrooms."

Selected major works

Notes

References 
 Faculty Profile Institute of Asian Research, University of British Columbia.

Canadian sinologists
Harvard Graduate School of Arts and Sciences alumni
Academic staff of the University of British Columbia
Colorado College faculty
Australian National University alumni
20th-century Canadian historians
Social historians
Living people
Year of birth missing (living people)
21st-century Canadian historians